Mount Ayanganna is a sandstone tepui in the Pakaraima Mountains of western Guyana, and located  east of Mount Roraima.

It is part of the Guiana Shield and Guyana Highlands.

Ecology
The slopes of Mount Ayanganna are covered in tall-canopy lower montane forest, up to about 1100 metres. Above this elevation, there is a series of "steps" - relatively flat plateaus separated by steeper slopes. The poorly drained plateaus support low-canopy forest or terrestrial bromeliads. The slopes support medium-canopy high-montane forest. The amphibians and reptiles of Ayanganna have been  surveyed.

Mount Ayanganna is fully within Guyanese territory and is surrounded by rainforest.

Culture
In 1966, the national flag was planted on Mount Ayanganna to commemorate Independence. It is undertaken yearly by members of the Guyana Defence Force. The Georgetown army base headquarters is also named after Mount Ayanganna. In 1992, the first female soldier joined the expedition.

See also

References

Ayanganna
Ayanganna
Guayana Highlands